Stoyan Stoyanov (born 15 February 1956) is a Bulgarian rower. He competed in the men's coxed four event at the 1980 Summer Olympics.

References

External links
 

1956 births
Living people
Bulgarian male rowers
Olympic rowers of Bulgaria
Rowers at the 1980 Summer Olympics
Place of birth missing (living people)